Reliance Institute of Life Sciences  (RILS), established by Dhirubhai Ambani Foundation, is an institution of higher education in various fields of life sciences and related technologies.

About
The Reliance Institute of Life Sciences (RILS) is an educational institution offering higher learning in various domains of life sciences and related technologies. Established by the Dhirubhai Ambani Foundation, it is said to be India’s pioneer institute in offering graduate, post-graduate, doctoral, research and continuing education programs in several emerging areas of science and technology.

Courses
The institute offers training in specific areas of fundamental and applied research, including basic and applied sciences, agriculture and environment sciences, process development and manufacturing sciences, clinical research and science and engineering courses in the computer, biomedical and pharmaceutical fields.

Faculty
The institute is headed by its Chairman, business magnate, Mukesh Ambani. Vice-chairman K. V. Subramaniam, Director Dr. Arnab Kapat and executive members Prof. Arvind Kudchadker, Dilip Kumar Ghosh and Vinay Ranade make up the rest of the power-packed team.

The permanent teaching faculty comprises a pool of eminent scientists working for Reliance Life Sciences. Visiting faculty includes professors from other reputed academic institutions and veterans from the life sciences industry.

Infrastructure
RILS has state-of-the-art lecture halls and a fully equipped library complete with a reference section, a regular text section and a computing facility with Internet access.

Special programs
As the name suggests, RILS’s 'Competency Development Program' focuses on training aspirants in the domain of life sciences by developing their competencies in life sciences and allied areas. A three-month classroom training stint is followed by nine months of on-field training in which candidates are thoroughly assessed for their learning and performance abilities.

The Young Professionals’ Program consists of a range of courses, each especially designed to hone its students’ skills in a highly specialized area. Some of these courses are listed below:
 Young Quality Management Professionals' Program (YQMPP)- Highly reputed program offered by Reliance Institute of Life Sciences. One year program divided into one month classroom training and eleven month on the job training. 
The Young Engineers’ Program (YEP) trains students in the fields of designing, engineering, implementing, installing, commissioning and validating highly automated bio-pharmaceuticals manufacturing plants while complying with the regulations of Indian FDA, USFDA and EMEA.
 The Young Clinical Professionals' Program (YCPP) trains participants in various aspects of clinical research and trials, bio-equivalence and bio-availability studies as well as regulatory affairs.
 Students of the Young Scientists' Program (YSP) the fundamentals of biological sciences and good laboratory practices.
 The ECG Readers' Program (ERP) is a highly specialized program that trains medical doctors on ECG measurement, annotation and overall assessment to be at par with international standards.
Other programs include Young Manufacturing Professionals' Program (YMPP), Young Medico-Marketing Professionals' Program (YMMPP), Young Agri-Professionals Program (YAPP)  and Young Laboratory Technicians Program (YLTP).

Advanced Diploma Programs
RILS offers advanced diploma programs in bio-therapeutics and clinical research.

Biotherapeutics

Under this program, students are trained on modules covering topics like:
Embryonic stem cells
Ocular stem cells
Haematopoietic stem cells
Skin and tissue engineering
Cell biology
Plant engineering
cGMP manufacturing
Quality management
Clinical research
Occupational health and safety

The program stretches across three months of classroom training followed by a nine-month project studying areas like:
Cell biology
Molecular biology
Upstream process engineering
Downstream process engineering
cGMP manufacturing
Plant engineering
Quality management

Clinical research

It focuses on conducting clinical trials for bioavailability/bio-equivalence studies of drug molecules and is designed to meet the needs of Contract Research Organizations. A few of the modules offered by the program are:
Good Clinical Practices (GCP) and regulatory overview
Preclinical Studies and Pharmacology
Clinical study document preparation
Clinical trial initiation

Project management
Data Management
Biostatistics
Risk in clinical research
Influence of technology.

Symposia
In collaboration with Reliance Life Sciences, RILS conducts regular international symposia with the aim of creating a knowledge-sharing platform for the entire scientific fraternity of the world. It has conducted three international symposia till date.

The symposium conducted in 2006 focused on Preventive and Predictive Molecular Diagnostics and Stem Cells and Regenerative Medicine and, in 2007, on Evidence-Based Practices in Reproductive and Fetal Medicine.

Workshops
RILS also conducts specialized workshops to impart training on the various aspects of genetically inherited diseases, testing and methodology and the psychological and social aspects of counseling.

References

Research institutes in Mumbai
Scientific organisations based in India
Medical education in India
Life sciences industry
Research institutes established in 2001
Reliance Life Sciences
2001 establishments in Maharashtra